Sinun  (also written Sinuni, Sinooni or Snuny,) is a town located in the Sinjar District of the Ninawa Governorate in Iraq. The town is located north of the Sinjar Mount. It belongs to the disputed territories of Northern Iraq.

Sinun is populated by Yazidis.

References

Populated places in Nineveh Governorate
Yazidi populated places in Iraq